The Klamath largescale sucker (Catostomus snyderi) is a species of ray-finned fish in the family Catostomidae.

It is endemic to the Klamath River basin in northern California and southern Oregon, within the Western United States.

Relationship with humans
The International Game Fish Association all tackle world record for the species stands at 2 lb 11 oz from the Sprague River in Oregon, USA.

Sources 
 

Specific

Catostomus
Fish of the Western United States
Freshwater fish of the United States
Endemic fauna of the United States
Fauna of California
Klamath River
Fish described in 1898
Taxonomy articles created by Polbot